Spring Board International Preschools  educate children between  years to 5 years of age. Owned by actor-educationalist Vishnu Manchu, the international preschool operates over preschools in India.

References

External links

Schools in Hyderabad, India
Educational institutions established in 2013
2013 establishments in Andhra Pradesh